Salvador Vila is a Spanish Olympic hurdler. He represented his country in the men's 400 metres hurdles at the 1996 Summer Olympics. His time was a 50.55 in the hurdles.

References

1969 births
Living people
Spanish male hurdlers
Olympic athletes of Spain
Athletes (track and field) at the 1996 Summer Olympics